The King Alfonso XIII's Cup 1928 was the 28th staging of the Copa del Rey, the Spanish football cup competition.

The competition started on 31 January 1928, and concluded on 29 June 1928, with the second final tiebreaker, held at the Estadio El Sardinero in Santander. FC Barcelona won the competition for the eighth time.

Calendar

Teams
As in the previous tournament, 26 teams entered the competition. 
Aragon: Iberia SC, Patria Aragón
Asturias: Real Oviedo, Racing de Sama
Balearic Islands: US Mahón
Cantabria: Racing de Santander, Gimnástica de Torrelavega
Castile and León: Cultural y Deportiva Leonesa, Real Unión Deportiva
Catalonia: FC Barcelona, CD Europa
Extremadura: Patria FC
Galicia: Celta de Vigo, Deportivo de La Coruña
Gipuzkoa: Real Unión, Real Sociedad
Murcia: Real Murcia, Cartagena FC
 Centre Region: Real Madrid, Athletic Madrid
 South Region: Sevilla FC, Real Betis
Valencia: Valencia CF, Levante FC
 Biscay: Athletic Bilbao, CD Alavés

Qualifying round

|}

Group stage

Group I

Group II

Group III

Group IV

Knockout stage

Quarterfinals

|}

Semifinals

|}

Final

Replay

Second replay

References

Copa del Rey seasons
Copa del Rey
Copa